Luke  is a male given name, and less commonly, a surname.

The name Luke is the English form of the Latin name .

Although the name is attested in ancient inscriptions, the best known historical use of the name is in the New Testament. The Gospel of Luke was written around 70 to 90 AD (the exact years are unknown). Luke, who is credited with the authorship of the Gospel of Luke, was a physician who lived around 30 to 130 AD. Luke is also credited with the Book of Acts in the Bible, and also is mentioned by the Apostle Paul in some of Paul's letters to first-century churches.

The name is sometimes used as a nickname for Luther.

Popularity

In 2020, Luke was the 31st most popular name for babies in the United States.

Notable people with the given name "Luke" include

Mononym 
Luke the Evangelist (died 84), one of the Four Evangelists
Luke (rapper) (born 1960), stage name of American rapper Luther Campbell

A
Luke Abbott, English electronic musician
Luke Ablett (born 1982), Australian rules footballer
Luke Abraham (born 1983), English rugby union footballer
Luke Adam (born 1990), Canadian ice hockey player
Luke Adams (disambiguation), multiple people
Luke Adamson (born 1987), English rugby league footballer
Luke Aikins (born 1973), American skydiver
Luke Allen (1978–2022), American baseball player
Luke Allen-Gale (born 1984), British actor
Luke Ambler (born 1989), Irish rugby league footballer
Luke Amos (born 1997), English footballer
Luke Anderson (born 1981), South African-Welsh chef
Luke Anguhadluq (1895–1982), Canadian artist
Luke Anthony (born 1976), Australian actor
Luke Appling (1907–1991), American baseball player
Luke Archer (1899–1988), American baseball player
Luke Armstrong (born 1996), English footballer
Luke Arnold (born 1984), Australian actor
Luke Arscott (born 1984), English rugby union footballer
Luke Ashworth (born 1989), English footballer
Luke Askew (1932–2012), American actor
Luke Ayling (born 1991), English footballer

B
Luke Babbitt (born 1989), American basketball player
Luke Bailey (disambiguation), multiple people
Luke Bain (born 2000), Scottish rugby league footballer
Luke Baines (born 1990), English-Australian actor
Luke Bakhuizen (born 1993), Australian photographer
Luke Baldauf (born 1969), Virgin Island windsurfer
Luke Ball (born 1984), Australian rules footballer
Luke Baldwin (born 1990), English rugby union footballer
Luke Bambridge (born 1995), British tennis player
Luke Bard (born 1990), American baseball player
Luke Barnatt (born 1988), English mixed martial artist
Luke Barry, Irish actor
Luke Bateman (born 1995), Australian rugby league footballer
Luke Bateman (trade unionist) (1873–??), British trade unionist
Luke Bates (1873–1943), British trade unionist
Luke Bayer (born 1992), English actor
Luke Beauchamp (born 1992), Australian rugby union footballer
Luke Beaufort (born 2001), South African cricketer
Luke Becker (born 1999), American racing driver
Luke Beckett (born 1976), English footballer
Luke Bedford (born 1978), British composer
Luke Bell (disambiguation), multiple people
Luke Belton (1918–2006), Irish politician
Luke Benward (born 1995), American actor
Luke Berry (born 1992), English footballer
Luke Beveridge (born 1970), Australian rules footballer
Luke Bezzina (born 1995), Maltese sprinter
Luke Biasi (born 1999), American soccer player
Luke Bilyk (born 1994), Canadian actor
Luke Black (born 1992), Serbian singer-songwriter
Luke Blackaby (born 1991), English cricketer
Luke P. Blackburn (1816–1887), American physician and politician
Luke Blackwell (born 1986), Australian rules footballer
Luke Blake, English rugby league footballer
Luke Blakely (born 1988), English-Antiguan footballer
Luke Boden (born 1988), English footballer
Luke Bodensteiner (born 1970), American skier
Luke Bodnar (born 2000), Australian footballer
Luke Bolton (born 1999), English footballer
Luke Bond (born 1980), British organist
Luke Bonner (born 1985), American basketball player
Luke Booker (1762–1835), English clergyman
Luke Booth, British product designer
Luke Bourgeois (born 1977), Australian tennis player
Luke Bowanko (born 1991), American football player
Luke Bowen (born 1986), British race car driver
Luke Kibet Bowen (born 1983), Kenyan runner
Luke Boyd (disambiguation), multiple people
Luke Bracey (born 1989), Australian actor
Luke Braid (born 1988), New Zealand rugby union footballer
Luke Branighan (born 1981), Australian rugby league footballer
Luke Brattan (born 1990), Australian football player
Luke Brennan (disambiguation), multiple people
Luke Bretherton, British theologian
Luke Breust (born 1990), Australian rules footballer
Luke Briscoe (born 1994), English rugby league footballer
Luke Bronin (born 1979), American politician
Luke Brooks (born 1994), Australian rugby league footballer
Luke Brooks (American soldier) (1731–1817), American soldier
Luke Brookshier (born 1971), American television writer
Luke Brown (disambiguation), multiple people
Luke Browning (born 2002), British racing driver
Luke Brugnara (born 1963), American real estate investor
Luke Bryan (born 1976), American country singer
Luke Bullen (born 1973), English drummer
Luke Burbank (born 1976), American radio host
Luke Burgess (disambiguation), multiple people
Luke Burke (born 1998), English footballer
Luke F. Burns (1881–1956), American politician
Luke Burrage (born 1980), British juggler
Luke Burt (born 1981), Australian rugby league coach
Luke Burton (born 1994), Australian rugby union footballer
Luke Busby (born 1981), English singer-songwriter
Luke Butkus (born 1979), American football coach
Luke Butterworth (born 1983), Australian cricketer

C
Luke Cain (born 1980), Australian shooter
Luke Caldwell (born 1991), Scottish runner
Luke Campbell (disambiguation), multiple people
Luke Cann (born 1994), Australian javelin thrower
Luke Capewell (born 1989), Australian rugby league footballer
Luke Carlin (born 1980), Canadian-American baseball player
Luke Carroll (born 1982), Australian actor
Luke Carter (born 1960), New Zealand sailor
Luke Carty (born 1997), Irish rugby union footballer
Luke Casserly (born 1973), Australian footballer
Luke Caudillo (born 1980), American mixed martial artist
Luke Chadwick (born 1980), English footballer
Luke Challoner (1550–1613), Irish academic
Luke Chambers (born 1985), English footballer
Luke Chambers (footballer, born 2004) (born 2004), English footballer
Luke Chan (1896–1983), Chinese-Canadian actor
Luke Chapman (born 1991), English footballer
Luke Charlesworth (born 1992), New Zealand badminton player
Luke Charman (born 1997), English footballer
Luke Charteris (born 1983), Welsh rugby union footballer
Luke Ching (born 1972), conceptual artist and labour activist from Hong Kong
Luke Chrysoberges (??–1169), Patriarch of Constantinople
Luke Chueh (born 1973), Chinese-American painter
Luke Clark (born 1994), English footballer
Luke Clausen (born 1978), American fisherman
Luke Clennell (1781–1840), British painter
Luke Clippinger (born 1972), American politician and lawyer
Luke Clough (1878–1956), Australian politician
Luke Cole (1962–2009), American lawyer
Luke Cole (rugby union) (born 1993), English rugby union footballer
Luke Collis (born 1988), American football player
Luke Combs (born 1990), American singer-songwriter
Luke Conlan (born 1994), Northern Irish footballer
Luke Connolly (born 1992), Irish-Gaelic footballer
Luke Cook (born 1986), Australian actor
Luke Cook (footballer) (born 2002), English footballer
Luke Cooper (born 1994), English rugby league footballer
Luke Corbett (born 1984), English footballer
Luke Cornish (born 1979), Australian artist
Luke Cornwall (born 1980), English footballer
Luke Coulson (born 1994), English footballer
Luke Covell (born 1981), New Zealand rugby league footballer
Luke Cowan-Dickie (born 1993), English rugby union footballer
Luke F. Cozans (1836–1903), American politician
Luke Crane (born 1985), Australian rules footballer
Luke Cresswell (born 1963), English percussionist
Luke Croll (born 1995), English footballer
Luke Crosbie (born 1997), Scottish rugby union footballer
Luke Cummo (born 1980), American mixed martial artist
Luke Cundle (born 2002), English footballer
Luke Cuni (1911–1980), Albanian-Australian teacher
Luke Currie (born 1981), Australian jockey
Luke Curtin (born 1977), American ice hockey player
Luke Cutts (born 1988), British pole vaulter

D
Luke Dahlhaus (born 1992), Australian rules footballer
Luke Daniels (born 1988), English footballer
Luke Darcy (born 1975), Australian rules footballer
Luke Davenport (born 1993), British racing driver
Luke Davids, South African sprinter
Luke Davies (disambiguation), multiple people
Luke Davies-Uniacke (born 1999), Australian rules footballer
Luke Davison (born 1990), Australian cyclist
Luke Dawai (??–1970), Fijian chief
Luke Dawson, American screenwriter
Luke Dean (disambiguation), multiple people
Luke de Beaulieu (??–1723), English cleric
Luke Delaney (born 1989), Australian rules footballer
Luke Delaney (astronaut) (born 1979), American astronaut
Luke Del Rio (born 1994), American football player and coach
Luke Demetre (born 1990), Canadian bobsledder
Luke Dempsey (born 1979/1980), Irish Gaelic football manager
Luke de Pulford (born 1984), English activist
Luke de Tany (??–1282), English noble
Luke DeVere (born 1989), Australian footballer
Luke de Woolfson (born 1976), British actor
Luke Digby (born 2001), British figure skater
Luke Dillon (disambiguation), multiple people
Luke Dimech (born 1977), Maltese footballer
Luke Di Somma, New Zealand lyricist
Luke Dobie (born 1992), English footballer
Luke Doerner (born 1979), Australian field hockey player
Luke Dollman, Australian conductor
Luke Donald (born 1977), English professional golfer
Luke Donald (footballer) (born 1971), Australian rules footballer
Luke Donaldson (born 2000), New Zealand rugby union footballer
Luke Doneathy (born 2001), English cricketer
Luke Donnellan (born 1966), Australian politician
Luke Donnelly (born 1996), Scottish footballer
Luke Doolan (born 1979), Australian film editor
Luke Doran (born 1991), Australian cricketer
Luke Dorn (born 1982), Australian rugby league footballer
Luke Doty (born 2001), American football player
Luke Doucet (born 1973), Canadian singer-songwriter
Luke Douglas (born 1986), Scottish footballer
Luke Dowler (born 1981), American songwriter
Luke Drone (born 1984), American football player
Luke Drury (disambiguation), multiple people
Luke Duffy (1890–1961), Irish trade unionist
Luke Duffy (rugby league) (born 1980), Australian rugby league footballer
Luke Dunstan (born 1995), Australian rules footballer
Luke Durbridge (born 1991), Australian racing cyclist
Luke Duzel (born 2002), Australian footballer
Luke Dwyer (born 1977/1978), Australian rules football coach
Luke Dyer (born 1981), Australian rugby league footballer

E
Luke Easter (disambiguation), multiple people
Luke Ebbin, American record producer
Luke Edmunds, Australian politician
Luke Edwards (born 2002), Australian rules footballer
Luke Egan (born 1970), Australian surfer
Luke Erede Ejohwomu (born 1936), Nigerian royal
Luke Elliot (born 1984), American singer-songwriter
Luke Elwes (born 1961), British artist
Luke Erceg (born 1993), Australian actor
Luke Erickson (born 1982), American ice hockey player
Luke Esser, American politician
Luke Evans (disambiguation), multiple people
Luke Eve (born 1974), Australian film producer
Luke Eves (born 1989), English rugby union footballer

F
Luke Fagan (1659–1733), Irish bishop
Luke Falk (born 1994), American football player
Luke Farmer (born 1980), Australian rules umpire
Luke Farrell (disambiguation), multiple people
Luke Faust (born 1936), American musician
Luke Fawcett (1881–1960), British trade unionist
Luke Feldman (born 1984), Australian cricketer
Luke Felsch (born 1974), Australian rugby league footballer
Luke Fenhaus (born 2004), American racing driver
Luke Ferreira (born 1995), American soccer player
Luke Fickell (born 1973), American football coach
Luke Fildes (1843–1927), British painter
Luke Fildes (fencer) (1879–1970), British fencer 
Luke Fischer (born 1994), Armenian-American basketball player
Luke 'Ming' Flanagan (born 1972), Irish politician
Luke Fletcher (born 1988), English cricketer
Luke Fletcher (politician) (born 1995/1996), Welsh politician
Luke Fleurs (born 2000), South African soccer player
Luke Flintoft (1680–1727), English clergyman
Luke Flynn (born 1988), American composer
Luke Foley (born 1970), Australian politician
Luke Foley (footballer) (born 1999), Australian rules footballer
Luke Folwell (born 1987), British artistic gymnast
Luke Ford (disambiguation), multiple people
Luke Fortune (born 1998), Irish Gaelic footballer
Luke Foster (born 1985), English footballer
Luke Fowler (born 1978), British artist
Luke Fox (disambiguation), multiple people
Luke Francis (born 1989), Welsh racing driver
Luke Frederick, American politician
Luke Freeman (born 1992), English footballer
Luke French (born 1985), American baseball player
Luke Friend (born 1996), English singer
Luke Fritz (born 1978), American football player
Luke Frost (born 1976), British painter
Luke Fulghum (born 1980), American ice hockey player
Luke Furner (1837–1912), Australian politician

G
Luke Gadsdon (born 1997), Canadian rower
Luke Gale (born 1988), English rugby league footballer
Luke Gallichan (born 1995), British cricketer
Luke Gambin (born 1993), English footballer
Luke Garbutt (born 1993), English footballer
Luke Gardiner (1690–1755), Irish politician
Luke Gardiner, 1st Viscount Mountjoy (1745–1798), Irish politician
Luke Garner (born 1995), Australian rugby league footballer
Luke Garnons (??–1615), English politician
Luke Garrard (born 1985), English footballer
Luke Garrett (born 1995), Welsh rugby union footballer
Luke Gazdic (born 1989), Canadian ice hockey player
Luke Gebbie (born 1996), Filipino swimmer
Luke Geissbühler (born 1970), American cinematographer
Luke Gell (born 1987), English actor
Luke George (born 1987), English rugby league footballer
Luke Georghiou (born 1955), British academic administrator
Luke Gernon (1580–1672), English judge
Luke Getsy (born 1984), American football player
Luke Gibleon, American sound editor
Luke Gifford (born 1995), American football player
Luke Gilford (born 1986), American writer
Luke Gillespie (born 1957), American pianist
Luke Gilliam (born 1976), British artist
Luke Gingras, Canadian paralympic athlete
Luke Glavenich (1893–1935), American baseball player
Luke Glendening (born 1989), American ice hockey player
Luke Goddard (born 1988), English golfer
Luke Godden (born 1978), Australian rules footballer
Luke Goedeke (born 1998), American football player
Luke Goodwin (born 1973), Australian rugby league footballer
Luke Gosling (born 1971), Australian politician
Luke Goss (born 1968), English singer and actor
Luke Gower, Australian vocalist
Luke Graham (disambiguation), multiple people
Luke Green (born 2002), Canadian soccer player
Luke Greenbank (born 1997), British swimmer
Luke Greenfield (born 1972), American film director
Luke Greenwood (1834–1909), English cricketer
Luke Gregerson (born 1984), American baseball player
Luke Grimes (born 1984), American actor
Luke M. Griswold (1837–1892), American seaman
Luke Gross (born 1969), American rugby union footballer
Luke Guldan (born 1986), American model
Luke Gullick (born 1986), English footballer
Luke Gunn (born 1985), British track athlete
Luke Guthrie (born 1990), American golfer
Luke Guttridge (born 1982), English footballer

H
Luke Haakenson (born 1997), American soccer player
Luke Haines (born 1967), English musician
Luke Hall (disambiguation), multiple people
Luke Hallett (born 2002), English footballer
Luke Halpin (born 1947), American actor
Luke Hamilton (born 1992), Scottish rugby league footballer
Luke Hamlin (1904–1978), American baseball player
Luke Hancock (born 1990), American basketball player
Luke Hannant (born 1993), English footballer
Luke Hansard (1752–1828), English printer
Luke Harangody (born 1988), American basketball player
Luke Harding (born 1968), British journalist
Luke Harding (linguist) (born 1977), Australian linguist
Luke Harlen (born 1984), Australian rugby league footballer
Luke Harrington-Myers (born 2001), Caymanian cricketer
Luke E. Hart (1880–1964), American religious figure
Luke Hartsuyker (born 1959), Australian politician
Luke Hasegawa, Japanese artist 
Luke Hawx (born 1981), American professional wrestler
Luke Hayden (1850–1897), Irish politician
Luke Hayes-Alexander (born 1990), Canadian chef
Luke Hedger (born 1995), British motorcycle racer
Luke Heimlich (born 1996), American baseball player
Luke Helder (born 1981), American criminal
Luke Helliwell (born 1988), English rugby league footballer
Luke Hemmerich (born 1998), German footballer
Luke Hemmings (born 1996), Australian singer
Luke Hemsworth (born 1980), Australian actor
Luke Hendrie (born 1994), English footballer
Luke Henman (born 2000), Canadian ice hockey player
Luke Herrmann (1932–2016), British art historian
Luke Heslop (1738–1825), English priest
Luke Higgins (1921–1991), American football player
Luke Higham (born 1996), English footballer
Luke Hines (born 1982), British auto racing driver
Luke Hinton (born 1990), British motorcycle racer
Luke Hochevar (born 1983), American tennis player
Luke Hodge (born 1984), Australian rules footballer
Luke Hodge (rugby league), Italian rugby league footballer 
Luke Hogan, British politician
Luke Holden (born 1988), English musician
Luke Holland (born 1993), American musician
Luke Hollman (born 2000), English cricketer
Luke Holmes (born 1983), Australian rugby union footballer
Luke Holmes (footballer) (born 1990), English footballer
Luke Homan (??–2006), American basketball player
Luke Joseph Hooke (1716–1796), Irish theologian
Luke Howard (1772–1864), British chemist
Luke Howard (musician) (born 1978), Australian composer
Luke Howarth (born 1972), Australian politician
Luke Howell (born 1987), English footballer
Luke Hubbins (born 1991), English footballer
Luke Hudson (born 1977), American baseball player
Luke Hughes (disambiguation), multiple people
Luke Hume (born 1988), American rugby league footballer
Luke Humphrey (born 1987), American-Canadian actor
Luke Humphries (born 1995), English darts player
Luke Hunt (born 1962), Australian journalist
Luke Hurley (born 1957), New Zealand singer-songwriter
Luke Hutton (??–1598), English criminal
Luke Hyam (born 1991), English footballer

I
Luke Irvine-Capel (born 1975), British priest
Luke Isakka (born 1980), Australian rugby league footballer
Luke Ivanovic (born 2000), Australian footballer

J
Luke Jackson (disambiguation), multiple people
Luke Jacobson (born 1997), New Zealand rugby union footballer
Luke Jacobz (born 1981), Australian actor
Luke Jager (born 2000), American skier
Luke James (disambiguation), multiple people
Luke Jerdy (born 1990), British actor
Luke Jenkins (born 2002), English footballer
Luke Jennings (born 1963), British author
Luke Jensen (born 1966), American tennis player
Luke Jephcott (born 2000), Welsh footballer
Luke Jericho (born 1984), Australian rules footballer
Luke Jerram (born 1974), British installation artist
Luke Joeckel (born 1991), American football player
Luke Johnson (disambiguation), multiple people
Luke Johnsos (1905–1984), American football player
Luke Johnston (born 1993), Scottish footballer
Luke Jones (disambiguation), multiple people
Luke Jongwe (born 1995), Zimbabwean cricketer
Luke Jordan (1892–1952), American guitarist
Luke Jordan (footballer) (born 1998), English footballer
Luke Joyce (born 1987), English footballer
Luke Jukulile (born 1973), Zimbabwean footballer
Luke Jurevicius, Australian film director
Luke Juriga (born 1997), American football player

K
Luke Katene (born 1986), New Zealand rugby union footballer
Luke Keaney (born 1992), Irish Gaelic footballer
Luke Keary (born 1992), Australian rugby league footballer
Luke Keeler (born 1987), Irish boxer
Luke A. Keenan (1872–1924), American politician
Luke Kelly (1940–1984), Irish folk singer
Luke Kelly (rugby league) (born 1989), Australian rugby league footballer
Luke Kendall (born 1981), Australian basketball player
Luke Kenley (born 1945), American politician
Luke Kennard (disambiguation), multiple people
Luke Kennedy (born 1982), Australian singer
Luke Kenny (born 1974), Indian actor
Luke Keough (born 1991), American cyclist
Luke Killeen (born 2005), Australian stock car racing driver
Luke Kipkosgei (born 1975), Kenyan runner
Luke Kirby (disambiguation), multiple people
Luke Kleintank (born 1990), American actor
Luke Koo, Ghanaian politician
Luke Korem (born 1982), American filmmaker
Luke Kornet (born 1995), American basketball player
Luke Knapke (born 1997), American basketball player
Luke Kreamalmeyer (born 1982), American soccer player
Luke Kuechly (born 1991), American football player
Luke Kunin (born 1997), American ice hockey player

L
Luke Laird (born 1978), American singer-songwriter
Luke Lambert (born 1981/1982), American auto racing mechanic
Luke Lamperti (born 2002), American cyclist
Luke Lawal Jr. (born 1989), American entrepreneur
Luke Lawrence, British racing driver
Luke Lawton (born 1980), American football player
Luke Lea (disambiguation), multiple people
Luke Leahy (born 1992), English footballer
Luke Leake (1828–1886), Australian politician
Luke Lee (born 1991), Singaporean actor
Luke Pyungse Lee (born 1959), American professor
Luke Lennon-Ford (born 1989), British sprinter
Luke Lennox (born 1983), Australian actor
Luke Leonard (born 1975), American artist
Luke Le Roux (born 2000), South African soccer player
Luke Letcher (born 1994), Australian rower
Luke Le Tissier (born 1996), English cricketer
Luke Fleet Lester, American professor
Luke Letlow (1979–2020), American politician
Luke Lewis (born 1983), Australian rugby league commentator
Luke Lillingstone (1653–1713), British army officer
Luke Lindoe (1913–2000), Canadian painter
Luke Lindon (1915–1988), American football player
Luke E. Linnan (1895–1975), American judge
Luke List (disambiguation), multiple people
Luke Livingston (born 1982), Australian rules footballer
Luke Losey (born 1968), English film director
Luke Loucks (born 1990), American basketball player
Luke Loughlin (born 1994/1995), Irish Gaelic footballer
Luke Lowden (born 1991), Australian rules footballer
Luke Lowe (1889–??), English footballer
Luke Lutenberg (1864–1938), American baseball player

M
Luke Mably (born 1976), English actor
Luke Livingston Macassey (1843–1908), Irish engineer
Luke MacDougall (born 1982), Australian rugby league footballer
Luke Macfarlane (born 1980), Canadian-American actor
Luke Madill (born 1980), Australian cyclist
Luke Magill (born 1987), English footballer
Luke Maile (born 1991), American baseball player
Luke Malaba (born 1951), Zimbabwean judge
Luke Mangan (born 1970), Australian restaurateur and chef
Luke Mariette (born 2003), Welsh footballer
Luke Marshall (born 1991), Irish rugby player
Luke Martin (born 1981), Australian basketball player
Luke Massey (born 1984), British film director
Luke Massey (rugby league) (born 1970), Australian rugby league footballer
Luke Masterson (born 1998), American football player
Luke Matheny (born 1976), American actor
Luke Matheson (disambiguation), multiple people
Luke Mathews (born 1995), Australian runner
Luke Paul Matlatarea (1938–1998), Papua New Guinean bishop
Luke Maxwell (born 1997), English footballer
Luke May (born 1989), English rugby league footballer
Luke Maye (born 1997), American basketball player
Luke Mbete (born 2003), English footballer
Luke McAlister (born 1983), New Zealand rugby union footballer
Luke McCabe (born 1976), Australian rules footballer
Luke McCaffrey (born 2001), American football player
Luke McCarthy (born 1993), English footballer
Luke McCormick (footballer, born 1983) (born 1983), English footballer
Luke McCormick (footballer, born 1999) (born 1999), English footballer
Luke McConnell (born 1975), American Marine Corps officer
Luke McCowan (born 1997), Scottish footballer
Luke McCown (born 1981), American football player
Luke McCullough (born 1994), Northern Irish footballer
Luke McDaniel (1927–1992), American singer
Luke McDermott (born 1987), American ice sled hockey player
Luke McDonald (disambiguation), multiple people
Luke McDonnell (born 1959), American artist
Luke McFadyen (born 1982), Australian rugby union footballer
Luke McGee (born 1995), English footballer
Luke McGrath (born 1993), Irish rugby union footballer
Luke McGregor (born 1983), Australian comedian
Luke McGuane (born 1987), Australian rules footballer
Luke A. McKay (born 1981), Australian film director
Luke McKenzie (born 1981), Australian triathlete
Luke McLean (born 1987), Italian rugby player
Luke McMaster (born 1976), Canadian singer-songwriter
Luke McNamee (1871–1952), American naval Admiral and businessman
Luke McNitt (born 1994), American football player
Luke McPharlin (born 1981), Australian rules footballer
Luke McShane (born 1984), English chess player
Luke McShane (footballer) (born 1985), English footballer
Luke Meade (born 1996), Irish hurler
Luke Medley (born 1989), English footballer
Luke Meerman (born 1975), American politician
Luke Mejares (born 1975), Filipino singer-songwriter
Luke Menzies (born 1988), English professional wrestler
Luke Messer (born 1969), American politician
Luke Metcalf (born 1999), Australian rugby league footballer
Luke Meyer, American filmmaker
Luke Milanzi (born 1994), Malawian football
Luke Miles (born 1986), Australian rules footballer
Luke "Long Gone" Miles (1925–1987), American singer-songwriter
Luke Miller (born 1966), English priest
Luke Miller (politician) (1815–1881), American politician
Luke Milligan (born 1976), British tennis player
Luke Mishu (born 1991), American soccer player
Luke Mitchell (disambiguation), multiple people
Luke Mitrani (born 1990), American snowboarder
Luke Mockridge (born 1989), German-Canadian comedian
Luke Mogelson, American journalist
Luke Molyneux (born 1998), English footballer
Luke Montebello (born 1995), Maltese footballer
Luke Montgomery (born 1973/1974), American political activist
Luke Montz (born 1983), American baseball manager
Luke Moore (disambiguation), multiple people
Luke Morahan (born 1990), Australian rugby league footballer
Luke Moran, American filmmaker
Luke Morgan (rugby union) (born 1992), Welsh rugby union footballer
Luke Morley (born 1960), English guitarist
Luke Morris (born 1988), English jockey
Luke Morrison, Australian canoeist
Luke Mossey (born 1992), British motorcycle rider
Luke Mudgway (born 1996), New Zealand cyclist
Luke Muldowney (born 1986), English footballer
Luke Mulholland (born 1988), English footballer
Luke Mullen (born 2001), American actor and environmentalist
Luke Muller (born 1996), American sailor
Luke Mullins (born 1984), Australian rules footballer
Luke Munana (born 1979), American ice dancer
Luke Munns (born 1980), Australian musician
Luke (Murianka) (born 1951), American bishop
Luke Murphy (born 1989), English footballer
Luke Murray (born 1980), New Zealand cricketer
Luke Murrin (??–1885), Irish-American politician
Luke Musgrave (born 2000), American football player
Luke Muyawa (born 1989), Malawian footballer
Luke Mwananshiku (1938–2003), Zambian banker
Luke Myring (born 1983), English rugby union footballer

N
Luke Narraway (born 1983), English rugby union coach
Luke Nelson (disambiguation), multiple people
Luke Netterville (1510–1560), Irish judge
Luke Netterville (priest) (died 1227), Irish archbishop
Luke Nevill (born 1986), Australian basketball player
Luke Newberry (born 1990), English actor
Luke Newton (born 1993), English actor
Luke Nguyen (born 1978), Vietnamese-Australian chef
Luke Nicholson, Canadian singer
Luke Nichter, American historian
Luke Nightingale (born 1980), English footballer
Luke Nolen (born 1980), Australian jockey
Luke Norman (born 1971), Australian rules footballer
Luke Norris (born 1993), English footballer
Luke Norris (actor) (born 1985), English actor
Luke Northmore (born 1997), English rugby union footballer
Luke Nosek (born 1975/1976), Polish-American entrepreneur
Luke Null (born 1990), American actor and comedian
Luke Nussbaumer (born 1989), British cricketer
Luke Nuttall (born 2001), British Paralympic athlete

O
Luke O'Brien (born 1988), English footballer
Luke Chijiuba Ochulor, Nigerian military officer
Luke Ockerby (born 1992), Australian cyclist
Luke O'Connor (disambiguation), multiple people
Luke O'Dea (born 1990), Irish rugby union player
Luke O'Dea (footballer) (born 1993), Australian footballer
Luke O'Donnell (born 1980), Australian rugby league footballer
Luke O'Dwyer (born 1983), Australian rugby league footballer
Luke O'Farrell (born 1990), Irish hurler
Luke Offord (born 1999), English footballer
Luke Kercan Ofungi (1934–1990), Ugandan businessman and politician
Luke O'Halloran (born 1991), American painter
Luke Oldknow (born 2001), Zimbabwean cricketer
Luke Oliver (born 1984), English footballer
Luke O'Loughlin (born 1985), Australian actor
Luke O'Neill (disambiguation), multiple people
Luke O'Nien (born 1994), English footballer
Luke O'Reilly (disambiguation), multiple people
Luke O'Sullivan (born 1968), Australian rules footballer
Luke O'Sullivan (politician), Australian politician
Luke O'Toole (1873–1929), Irish-Gaelic athletic administrator
Luke Ottens (born 1976), Australian rules footballer
Luke Ouellette (born 1953), Canadian politician

P
Luke Page (born 1991), Papua New Guinean rugby league footballer
Luke Paget (1853–1937), English bishop
Luke Paris (born 1994), English footballer
Luke Parker (disambiguation), multiple people
Luke Parks (born 2001), Australian rules footballer
Luke Partington (born 1997), Australian rules footballer
Luke Pasqualino (born 1990), English actor
Luke Patel (born 1990), English cricketer
Luke Patience (born 1986), British sailor
Luke Patten (born 1980), Australian rugby league footballer
Luke Patterson (born 1987), American football player
Luke Pato, South African bishop
Luke Pavlou (born 1996), Australian footballer
Luke Pavone (born 1995), American soccer player
Luke Payne (born 1985), American basketball player
Luke Pearce (born 1987), British rugby union referee
Luke Pearson (born 1987), British cartoonist
Luke Pegler (born 1981), Australian actor
Luke Pen (1960–2002), Australian environmental scientist
Luke Pennell (born 1996), English footballer
Luke Penny (born 1981), Australian rules footballer
Luke Perry (disambiguation), multiple people
Luke Petitgout (born 1976), American football player
Luke Petrasek (born 1995), American basketball player
Luke Phillips (born 1975), Australian rugby league football official
Luke Pike (disambiguation), multiple people
Luke Pilkington (born 1990), Australian footballer
Luke Pilling (born 1997), English footballer
Luke Piper (born 1966), English painter
Luke Pither (born 1989), Canadian ice hockey player
Luke Plange (born 2002), English footballer
Luke Plapp (born 2000), Australian cyclist
Luke Plunket (disambiguation), multiple people
Luke P. Poland (1815–1887), American politician
Luke Pollard (born 1980), British politician
Luke Polselli (born 1998), Italian rugby league footballer
Luke Pomersbach (born 1984), Australian cricketer
Luke Ives Pontifell (born 1968), American publisher
Luke Pope (1740–1825), English florist
Luke Pople (born 1991), Australian wheelchair basketball player
Luke Potter (born 1989), English footballer
Luke Pougnault (born 1980), Australian rower
Luke Pratt (born 1989), Australian rules footballer
Luke Preston (born 1976), Welsh judoka
Luke Prestridge (born 1956), American football player
Luke Pretorius, South African bishop
Luke Price (born 1995), Welsh rugby union footballer
Luke Priddis (born 1977), Australian rugby union footballer
Luke Procter (born 1988), English cricketer
Luke Prokop (born 2002), Canadian ice hockey player
Luke Prokopec (born 1978), Australian baseball player
Luke Prosser (born 1988), English footballer
Luke Pryor (1820–1900), American politician
Luke Puskedra (born 1990), American runner
Luke Putkonen (born 1986), American baseball player

Q
Luke Quigley (born 1981), Australian rugby league footballer
Luke Quinlivan (born 1985), Australian water polo player

R
Luke Radford (born 1988), English cricketer
Luke Ramsay (born 1988), Canadian sailor
Luke A. Rankin (born 1962), American politician
Luke Rathborne, American musician
Luke Ravenstahl (born 1980), American politician
Luke Rawson (born 2001), English footballer
Luke Rayner, British guitarist
Luke Recker (born 1978), American basketball player
Luke Redfield (born 1983), American musician
Luke Reilly (born 1995), Canadian swimmer
Luke Reimer, Australian rugby union footballer
Luke Reeves (born 1980), English-Australian cricketer
Luke Reynolds (born 1979), American singer-songwriter
Luke Rhinehart (1932–2020), American novelist
Luke Rhodes (born 1992), American football player
Luke Richardson (born 1969), Canadian ice hockey coach
Luke Richardson (strength athlete) (born 1997), British powerlifter
Luke Ricketson (born 1973), Australian rugby league footballer
Luke Ridnour (born 1981), American basketball player
Luke Rivington (1838–1899), English priest
Luke Roberts (born 1977), Australian cyclist
Luke Roberts (actor) (born 1977), English actor
Luke Robertson (born 1985), British explorer
Luke Robins (born 1994), Australian cricketer
Luke Robinson (disambiguation), multiple people
Luke Rockhold (born 1984), American mixed martial artist
Luke Rodgers (born 1982), English footballer
Luke Romano (born 1986), New Zealand rugby union footballer
Luke Romyn (born 1975), Australian author
Luke Ronchi (born 1981), New Zealand-Australian cricketer
Luke Rooney (born 1983), Australian rugby union footballer
Luke Rooney (footballer) (born 1990), English footballer
Luke Roskell (born 1997), English actor
Luke Ross (born 1972), American comic artist
Luke Rossouw, South African rugby union footballer
Luke Rounds (born 1991), Australian rules footballer
Luke Rowe (disambiguation), multiple people
Luke Russe (born 1999), English footballer
Luke Russell (born 1992), Australian rules footballer
Luke Russert (born 1985), American news correspondent
Luke Ryan (born 1996), Australian rules footballer
Luke Ryan (cricketer) (born 1988), English cricketer

S
Luke Sabis, American filmmaker
Luke Samoa (born 1988), New Zealand-Romanian rugby union footballer
Luke Sanders (born 1985), American mixed martial artist
Luke Sassano (born 1985), American soccer player
Luke Him Sau (1904–1991), Chinese architect
Luke Sauder (born 1970), Canadian skier
Luke Saville (born 1994), Australian tennis player
Luke Sayers, Australian businessman
Luke Scanlan (1841–1915), American farmer and politician
Luke Scanlon (born 1996), Irish hurler
Luke Scavuzzo (born 1956), American politician
Luke Schaub (1690–1758), British diplomat
Luke Schenn (born 1989), Canadian ice hockey player
Luke Schenscher (born 1982), Australian basketball player
Luke Schlemmer (born 1995), South African cricketer
Luke Schoolcraft (1847–1893), American musical composer
Luke Schoonmaker (born 1998), American football player
Luke Schwartz (born 1984), English poker player
Luke Scott (disambiguation), multiple people
Luke Scully (born 2000), Welsh rugby union footballer
Luke Sears (born 1980), English cricketer
Luke Sela (??–2007), Papua New Guinean newspaper editor
Luke Sellars (born 1981), Canadian ice hockey player
Luke Seomore, English film director
Luke Sewell (1901–1987), American baseball player
Luke Shackleton (born 1984), Australian rules footballer
Luke Sharry (born 1990), English footballer
Luke Shaw (born 1995), English footballer
Luke Short (1854–1893) American cowboy and gunfighter
Luke Shuey (born 1990), Australian rules footballer
Luke Sikma (born 1989), American basketball player
Luke Icarus Simon (born 1963), Australian author
Luke Simmonds (born 1979), English snooker player
Luke Simons (born 1978), American politician
Luke Simpkin (born 1979), British boxer
Luke Simpkins (born 1964), Australian politician
Luke Simpson (born 1994), English footballer
Luke Sital-Singh (born 1988), British singer-songwriter
Luke Skaarup (born 1979), Canadian engineer
Luke Ski (born 1974), American rap artist
Luke Slater (born 1968), English disc jockey
Luke Smalley (1955–2009), American photographer
Luke Smith (disambiguation), multiple people
Luke Snellin (born 1986), English screenwriter
Luke Somers (1981–2014), American photojournalist
Luke Elliott Sommer (born 1986), Canadian-American bank robber
Luke Song (born 1972), American fashion designer
Luke Southwood (born 1997), English footballer
Luke Spencer (soccer) (born 1990), American soccer player
Luke Spokes (born 2000), English footballer
Luke Staley (born 1980), American football player
Luke Stannard, American gymnast
Luke Staton (born 1979), English footballer
Luke Stauffacher (born 1980), American ice hockey player
Luke Steckel (born 1985), American football coach
Luke Steele (disambiguation), multiple people
Luke Stewart, American mixed martial artist
Luke Stewart (musician), American musician
Luke Steyn (born 1993), Zimbabwean skier
Luke Stocker (born 1988), American football player
Luke Stokes, English colonist
Luke Stoltman (born 1984), Scottish strongman
Luke Stoughton (cricketer) (born 1977), English cricketer
Luke Stricklin (born 1982), American singer-songwriter
Luke Stringer (born 1995), South African rugby union player
Luke Strobel (born 1986), American mountain biker
Luke Strong (disambiguation), multiple people
Luke Stuart (born 1977), Australian rugby league footballer
Luke Stuart (baseball) (1892–1947), American baseball player
Luke Sullivan (born 1961), Australian artist
Luke Summerfield (born 1987), English footballer
Luke Sutherland (born 1971), Scottish novelist
Luke Sutton (born 1976), English cricketer
Luke Swain (born 1982), Australian rugby league footballer
Luke Swan (born 1984), American football player
Luke Swann (1983–2022), English cricket coach
Luke Syson, English museum curator

T
Luke Taft (1783–1863), American industrial pioneer
Luke Tait (born 1981), Canadian rugby union footballer
Luke Takamura (born 1964), Japanese singer-songwriter
Luke Tan (born 1977), American singer-songwriter
Luke Tapscott (born 1991), Australian rules footballer
Luke Tarsitano (born 1990), American actor
Luke Tasker (born 1991), American football player
Luke Taylor (born 1994), English field hockey player
Luke Temple, American singer-songwriter
Luke Tenuta (born 1999), American football player
Luke Thomas (disambiguation), multiple people
Luke Thompson (disambiguation), multiple people
Luke Tierney, American statistician
Luke Tilley (born 1983), British entomologist
Luke Tilt (born 1988), English footballer
Luke Tittensor (born 1989), English actor
Luke Toia (born 1977), Australian rules footballer
Luke Tomlinson (born 1977), English polo player
Luke Tongue (born 1999), New Zealand footballer
Luke Tonkin, Australian actor
Luke Top (born 1980), American singer-songwriter
Luke Torian (born 1958), American politician
Luke Towers (born 1988), Australian cricketer
Luke Trainor (1900–1973), Australian rules footballer
Luke Travers (born 2001), Australian basketball player
Luke Traynor (born 1993), British runner
Luke Treadaway (born 1984), British actor
Luke Trickett, Australian swimmer
Luke Turley (born 2000), English swimmer

U
Luke Urban (1898–1980), American football player
Luke Ussher (??–1632), Irish deacon

V
Luke van der Smit (born 1994), Namibian rugby union footballer
Luke Varney (born 1982), English footballer
Luke Vercollone (born 1982), American soccer player
Luke Vibert (born 1973), British musician
Luke Vivian (born 1981), New Zealand cricketer
Luke Vogels (born 1983), Australian rules footballer
Luke Voit (born 1991), American baseball player

W
Luke Wadding (1588–1657), Irish historian and friar
Luke Wade-Slater (born 1998), Irish footballer
Luke Waechter (born 1994), American soccer player
Luke Walker (disambiguation), multiple people
Luke Wall (born 1996), English footballer
Luke Wallace (born 1990), English rugby union footballer
Luke Walsh (born 1987), Australian rugby league footballer
Luke Walton (disambiguation), multiple people
Luke Ward (disambiguation), multiple people
Luke Warde, English naval officer
Luke Ward-Wilkinson (born 1993), English actor and singer
Luke Waterfall (born 1990), English footballer
Luke Waterworth (born 1996), English rugby league footballer
Luke Watkins (born 1989), English boxer
Luke Watson (disambiguation), multiple people
Luke Wattenberg (born 1997), American football player
Luke J. Weathers (1920–2011), American air force officer
Luke Weaver (disambiguation), multiple people
Luke Webb (born 1986), English footballer
Luke Webb (cricketer) (born 1995), English cricketer
Luke Webster (born 1982), Australian rules football coach
Luke Weller (born 1982), Australian rules footballer
Luke Wells (born 1990), English cricketer
Luke Wessman, American tattoo artist
Luke Whisnant (born 1957), American novelist
Luke White (disambiguation), multiple people
Luke Whitehead (born 1981), American basketball player
Luke Whitelock (born 1991), New Zealand rugby union footballer
Luke Whitlatch (born 1977), American artist
Luke Wijohn (born 2002), New Zealand politician
Luke Wiles (born 1982), Canadian lacrosse player
Luke Wilkins (born 1989), Australian baseball player
Luke Wilkinson (born 1990), English footballer
Luke Wilkshire (born 1981), Australian footballer
Luke Williams (disambiguation), multiple people
Luke Williamson (born 1978), Australian rugby league footballer
Luke Willson (born 1990), Canadian-American football player
Luke Wilson (born 1971), American actor
Luke Wilton, English politician
Luke Winslow-King (born 1983), American guitarist
Luke Winters (born 1997), American skier
Luke Witkowski (born 1990), American ice hockey player
Luke Witte (born 1950), American basketball player
Luke Wood, American music executive
Luke Wood (cricketer) (born 1995), English cricketer
Luke Woodcock (born 1982), New Zealand cricketer
Luke Woodhouse (born 1988), English darts player
Luke Woodland (born 1995), English-Filipino footballer
Luke Woodrow (1921–2000), Canadian priest
Luke Woolfenden (born 1998), English footballer
Luke Worrall (born 1989), English model
Luke Wright (disambiguation), multiple people
Luke Wypler (born 2000/2001), American football player

Y
Luke Yaklich (born 1976), American basketball coach
Luke Yankee (born 1961), American writer
Luke Yates (born 1995), Australian rugby league footballer
Luke Yendle (born 2000), Welsh rugby union footballer
Luke Youlden (born 1978), Australian race car driver
Luke Young (disambiguation), multiple people
Luke Youngblood (born 1986), English actor
Luke Chia-Liu Yuan (1912–2003), Chinese-American physicist

Z
Luke Zachrich (born 1981), American mixed martial artist
Luke Zeller (born 1987), American basketball player
Luke Zimmerman (born 1979), American actor

Fictional characters 
Luke, from Trey Edward Shults’ 2019 drama film Waves
Luke (Buffyverse), a vampire in Buffy the Vampire Slayer
Lucky Luke, the titular character in the eponymous Belgian comic book series set in the American Old West
Luke Baker, from Degrassi
Luke Duke, the elder of two freewheeling cousins in the 1985 television series Dukes of Hazzard
 Lucas "Luke" Bankole, June's husband in The Handmaid's Tale
Luke Cage, a comic superhero in the Marvel Universe
Luke Carlyle, in the Marvel Universe
Luke Castellan, from Percy Jackson & the Olympians
Luke Crain, from the Netflix series The Haunting of Hill House
Luke Danes, in the comedy-drama television series Gilmore Girls
Luke Deveruex, main character in the television film Universal Soldier 2
Luke the Dog, a recurring character in American silent comedy shorts in the 1910s
Luke Dunphy, in the television series Modern Family
Luke fon Fabre, the main character of the video game Tales of the Abyss
Luke Friedman, in the Netflix series Grand Army
Luke Hobbs, in The Fast and the Furious film series
 Luke Holliday, in the Netflix series 13 Reasons Why
Luke Patterson, a character from television series Julie and the Phantoms
Luke Ross, from the 2011 television series Jessie
Luke Skywalker, the main protagonist of the Star Wars original trilogy
Luke Smith in The Sarah Jane Adventures BBC series.
Luke Snyder, on the long-running daytime drama As the World Turns
Luke Spencer, on the long-running serial General Hospital
Luke Triton, in the Professor Layton video games
Luke the Warrior, an anthropomorphic mouse in the Redwall book series
Luke Patterson, one of the phantoms of the Netflix hit show, Julie and the Phantoms
 Luke, character from Telltale's The Walking Dead, Season 2

See also
Saint Luke (disambiguation), a disambiguation page for Saints named Luke

References
4.https://www.behindthename.com/name/luke

Given names of Greek language origin
Masculine given names
English masculine given names